Beres Hammond OJ (born Hugh Beresford Hammond; 28 August 1955, in Annotto Bay, Saint Mary, Jamaica) is a Jamaican reggae singer known in particular for his lovers rock music.  While his career began in the 1970s, he reached his greatest success in the 1990s.

Biography
Born the ninth of ten children, Hammond grew up listening to his father's collection of American soul and jazz music including Sam Cooke and Otis Redding. He was further influenced by the native music of ska and rocksteady, in particular Alton Ellis.

Hammond began participating in local talent contests from 1972 to 1973, which led to his first recording, of Ellis' "Wanderer". In 1975 he joined the band, Zap Pow, as lead singer, leading to the hit 1978 single, "The System" under the Aquarius Records label. However, he simultaneously sought a solo career, releasing his debut album, Soul Reggae, in 1976. His solo ballads "One Step Ahead" (1976) and Joe Gibbs produced "I'm in Love" (1978), were both hits in Jamaica. He left Zap Pow in 1979 to pursue his solo career, and recorded two more albums Let's Make A Song in 1980 and Red Light 1981.  He formed Tuesday's Children, a harmony group that toured but never recorded.

Hammond formed his own record label, Harmony House Records, in 1985 for the release of his Make a Song album, which had two Jamaican chart-toppers that were influenced by the emerging dancehall style: "Groovy Little Thing" and "What One Dance Can Do". The latter, produced by Willie Lindo, began to break Hammond into the international market.  He scored another hit in 1986 with "Settling Down" on his eponymous release.  He left his fame in Jamaica for New York City in 1987, after being tied up as thieves ransacked his house during a home invasion. There he recorded the Have a Nice Weekend album and the duet single "How Can We Ease the Pain" with Maxi Priest.

Hammond returned briefly to Jamaica to record Putting Up Resistance, which was significantly harder than his typical ballads, produced by Tappa Zukie, which spawned the hits "Putting Up Resistance" and "Strange". He signed with Penthouse Records in 1990 and returned to Jamaica permanently to record the dancehall smash "Tempted to Touch", with producer Donovan Germain. This is perhaps his best known song in the United States and United Kingdom, and set the foundation for the hits "Is This a Sign" and "Respect to You Baby" on the 1992 A Love Affair album. Also in 1992, Beres released the single "Fire". The song received critical acclaim within the Reggae music industry and it was an extremely sought after 7" single. Now garnering interest from major studios such as Elektra Records, Hammond recorded five more albums in the 1990s as well as several compilations, establishing himself as one of the top lovers rock artists.  His first album of the new millennium was 2001's Music Is Life, which featured an appearance by Wyclef Jean, and contributions from Earl "Chinna" Smith and Flourgon. The album spawned several hits, including "They Gonna Talk", "Rockaway" and "Ain't It Good To Know". The 2004 release Love Has No Boundaries, had guest spots by Buju Banton and Big Youth.

Hammond returned to Jamaica to perform at the Opening Ceremony for the Cricket World Cup 2007, and the next year, in 2008, he released album A Moment in Time, on VP Records, which featured the single "I Feel Good". After 4 years, which is 2012, Hammond released album One Love, One Life topped the Billboard Reggae Albums chart. In 2013, Hammond was awarded the Order of Jamaica by the Jamaican government in recognition of his "exceptional and dedicated contribution to the Jamaican music industry" right before his album  One Love, One Life was nominated for a Grammy Award in January 2014. For almost six years since album One Love, One Life released, Hammond released album, Never Ending in October 2018, which features contributions from musicians including Errol Holt, Mafia & Fluxy, Dean Fraser, and Robbie Lyn. After its first week of release, it topped the Billboard Reggae Albums Chart.

In 2019 Beres Hammond toured the United States and Canada.  The Never Ending tour started in late July in Danbury, Connecticut.  It also made stops in Baltimore, Cincinnati, Chicago, Boston, Toronto, Brooklyn, Philadelphia, Newark, Huntington (New York), Richmond (Virginia), Washington D.C., Norfolk (Virginia), Charlotte (North Carolina), Atlanta, Orlando and Fort Lauderdale.

On February 28, 2021, Harmony House and VP Records presented Love From A Distance Live, a streaming event with guest appearances by Buju Banton, Marcia Griffiths, and Popcaan during the COVID-19 pandemic quarantine. The show was streamed on Hammond's Facebook page and VP Records' YouTube page, and up to March 1, VP Records' stream was trending at number five.

Discography

Solo albums

Collaborative albums

Compilations

Cover versions of Beres Hammond songs

DVD

References

External links
 
 
 
 Smokeyroom's Harmony House Silekshan
 Yahoo! Music biography

Lovers rock musicians
Jamaican reggae singers
1955 births
Living people
People from Saint Mary Parish, Jamaica
20th-century Jamaican male singers
21st-century Jamaican male singers
VP Records artists